Vicente Céspedes (born 8 November 1966) is a Paraguayan judoka. He competed at the 1988 Summer Olympics and the 1992 Summer Olympics.

References

1966 births
Living people
Paraguayan male judoka
Olympic judoka of Paraguay
Judoka at the 1988 Summer Olympics
Judoka at the 1992 Summer Olympics
Place of birth missing (living people)